The Town of Clermont is a former local government area for Clermont, Queensland, Australia.

History

The Borough of Clermont was established in January 1867.

On 31 March 1903, under the Local Authorities Act (1902), the Borough of Clermont became the Town of Clermont.

In 1930, the Town of Clermont was absorbed into the Shire of Belyando (which had previously surrounded the town).

Mayors
 1867: John Winter 
 1883: B. Mullen 
 1891: H. H. Thompson 
 1892: W. G. Griffin 
 1921: Dr John Higgins 
 1927: E. Bowler

References

External links
 

Former local government areas of Queensland
1930 disestablishments in Australia